Grandville may refer to:

Places
 Grandville, Aube, a commune in France
 Grandville, Michigan, a city in the United States
 Grandville, Wallonia, a district of Oreye, Belgium
 La Grandville, a commune in Ardennes, France

Other uses
 Grandville (comics), a 2009 series of graphic novels by Bryan Talbot
 Grandville (graphic novel)
 The pseudonym of Jean Ignace Isidore Gérard Grandville (1803–1847), French caricaturist

See also
 Granville (disambiguation)